Wan'an is a town under the administration of Luojiang District, Deyang, Sichuan, China. , it has 14 residential communities and 4 villages under its administration.

References 

Township-level divisions of Sichuan
Deyang